The 1968 Hurricane (or Hurricane Low Q) was a deadly storm that moved through the Central Belt of Scotland during mid January 1968. It was described as Central Scotland's worst natural disaster since records began and the worst gale in the United Kingdom. Some said that the damage resembled what happened during the Clydebank Blitz in 1941. 20 people died from the storm, with 9 dead in Glasgow. 700 people were left homeless. Such high wind speeds in an urban area were equivalent to those witnessed in Paris during Cyclone Lothar in 1999.

A  wind gust was recorded at Great Dun Fell in Cumbria, England. At the time this was the strongest wind gust ever recorded in the United Kingdom, though this was superseded in 1986 when a  gust was recorded at Cairn Gorm.

Meteorological history 
The origins of this violent storm appear to be from a cold front near Bermuda on 13 January 1968. The system moved north of the Azores the next day and still appeared as a shallow low pressure area. The storm continued to move over Northern Europe before dissipating on 18 January 1968.

Impact

United Kingdom 
15 January 1968 began as a mild day, then temperatures grew cooler as the day progressed. In Glasgow alone, over 300 houses were destroyed and 70,000 homes were damaged. Due to the strong winds, half of Glasgow's council houses were damaged. Many people evacuated the then Europe's tallest flats as they began swaying. Officials said at least seven ships sank or went adrift in the river Clyde causing hundreds of thousands of pounds worth of damage. Off the east coast of Scotland, a drilling rig called Sea Quest was set adrift in rough seas. Over a thousand mature trees were downed in the Central Belt, as well as power lines. In total the storm felled 8,000 hectares of forest across Scotland (1.6 million cubic metres of timber). A Glasgow police spokesman said that it was 'absolute havoc' in the city. Electrical power also failed in Glasgow, leaving the whole city in darkness.

Large waves pounded the English Channel coastline.

Wind speeds

Rest of Europe 
In Denmark, officials in Copenhagen said that eight people died in the country from the storm.

Aftermath 
After the storm moved away, the death toll continued to rise. 30 people died from repairing houses. On 16 January 1968, about 150 troops from Edinburgh came to Glasgow to help with the clean-up operation. There was little national press coverage of the storm, despite it affecting most of northern England, Northern Ireland and Scotland. An interest-free loan of £500,000 was given by the Labour Government to the affected areas. Singer Frankie Vaughan began to raise funds for the victims of the storm by holding a special concert at Alhambra Theatre in Glasgow.

After the devastation of the storm in the area, the Glasgow City Council quickly imposed a new policy to improve housing in the city.

See also 
Great Sheffield Gale, which caused similar devastation in Sheffield in 1962
Cyclone Lothar (1999), notable for the prolonged high winds it brought to Paris

References

External links 
 Hansard: Scotland (Storm Damage)
 Storm Damage Glasgow 1968: You Tube
 

European windstorms
1968 in Scotland
Weather events in Scotland
1968 in Denmark
1968 meteorology
1968 disasters in the United Kingdom
January 1968 events in Europe